The Forester's Daughter is a 1931 German operetta film directed by Frederic Zelnik and starring Irene Eisinger, Paul Richter and Oskar Karlweis. It is an adaptation of the operetta Die Försterchristl. Zelnik had previously directed a 1926 silent film version The Bohemian Dancer.

The film's sets were designed by Heinz Fenchel and Jacek Rotmil.

Cast
Irene Eisinger as Christl Lange, known as "Försterchristl"
Paul Richter as Emperor Joseph II
Oskar Karlweis as Wolfgang Amadeus Mozart
 as Corporal Franzl Földessy
Tibor Halmay as Walperl
 as head Forester Lange, Christl's father
Jelly Staffel as Everl, Mozarts beloved
Adele Sandrock as Court Lady
Max Ralph-Ostermann as the Emperor's First Adjutant (as Max-Ralf Ostermann)
Hanns Waschatko as the Emperor's Second Adjutant
Gretel Berndt as Fräulein von Földessy
Louis V. Arco as Austrian officer
Ernst Wurmser as chef cook at the Vienna Hofburg
Heinrich Gotho as a notary
Alfred Frank as worker #1
Paul Hörbiger as The Old Baron
Sylvia Torf as a peasant woman
Rudolf Österreicher as worker #2

References

External links

1930s historical musical films
German historical musical films
Films of the Weimar Republic
Films directed by Frederic Zelnik
Operetta films
Films based on operettas
Films set in Austria
Films set in the 1780s
Films about Wolfgang Amadeus Mozart
Cultural depictions of Joseph II, Holy Roman Emperor
Films about royalty
Films scored by Bruno Granichstaedten
German black-and-white films
1930s German films